Kingsley Adeseye Ogunlewe  is a Nigerian politician, he is from a royal family of Igbogbo, he was elected Senator on the Alliance for Democracy (AD) platform in 1999 for the Lagos East constituency, before he defected to the PDP. He later became the Minister of Works from July 2003 to March 2006.
When he was sacked from this position by President Olusegun Obasanjo, it was said to be due to a feud with his former patron, Bode George, the Deputy National Chairman of the PDP.

Background

Ogunlewe is from an affluent dynasty of Igbogbo, a community in the Ikorodu Local Government Area of Lagos State. 
His elder brother, Dr. Akin Ogunlewe, was a permanent secretary in the Federal Ministry of Commerce and Industry, who was relieved of his position soon after Ogunlewe transferred to the PDP.

Ogunlewe is an alumnus of the University of Ibadan. During his stay in the premier University he lived in Mellanby Hall and participated actively in students politics.
He is a lawyer, and at one time was permanent secretary of Lagos State.

Senator

In July 2002, Senator Wahab Dosunmu and Adeseye Ogunlewe accused Lagos State Governor Bola Ahmed Tinubu of abusing trust of public funds through contract awards to his friends.

He ran for reelection in 2003 on the PDP ticket, but was defeated by Olorunnimbe Mamora of the Alliance for Democracy (AD).

Minister of works

In July 2003, Ogunlewe announced that the federal government would invest about US$2.85 billion in rehabilitating and upgrading the nation's highway network, and planned to make all roads in the country accessible by year end.
In January 2004, Ogunlewe said the Federal government had approved an extra N900 million for rehabilitation of roads in the South-east.

In April 2004, Ogunlewe won the Dr Kwame Nkrumah Africa Leadership Award in Accra, Ghana.
In May 2004, Ogunlewe published his mobile phone number and told people to use it if they saw any pot-holes or had a traffic accident. He said he was inundated with calls, but also said of the roads "They are fantastic now." He claimed that 12,600 km of roads had been rehabilitated in the past six months.

In June 2004, there were clashes in Lagos state between agents of the Federal Ministry of Works and officials of the Lagos State Traffic Management Authority. The clashes were over control of Federal roads, and were apparently linked to ongoing disputes between Ogunlewe and the state governor Bola Ahmed Tinubu of the  Alliance for Democracy.

In August 2004, Ogunlewe announced that The World Bank and the African Development Bank planned to cooperate with Nigeria to build the Trans-West African Highway from Lagos to Mauritania's capital Nouakchott.
In October 2004, Ogunlewe stated that the year 2005 would see faster rapid progress in road repair and construction.

In March 2006, after being dismissed from his job as Works Minister, Ogunlewe urged President Olusegun Obasanjo to seek a third term in office.

Later career

In July 2006, a Lagos State governorship candidate, Funsho Williams was found murdered in his home. Ogunlewe, who had been a rival for the PDP nomination, was arrested in connection with the murder.
He was later released, but in February 2007, he was re-arrested.

In November 2009, the Senate ad hoc committee on transport led by Heineken Lokpobiri, submitted a report to the upper house that revealed "alleged serial malpractices" in road contracting over a ten-year period, and recommended that former ministers of works Anthony Anenih, Adeseye Ogunlewe, Obafemi Anibaba, Cornelius Adebayo and others be prosecuted for corruption.
Senate discussion of the report was delayed.  Senator Ogunlewe resigned from his position as the Pro-Chancellor of the Federal University of Agriculture, Abeokuta in 2016. In 2019, Senator Ogunlewe left the Peoples Democratic Party for the All Progressives Congress

References

People from Lagos State
Living people
Yoruba politicians
Members of the Senate (Nigeria)
Alliance for Democracy (Nigeria) politicians
Peoples Democratic Party (Nigeria) politicians
Federal ministers of Nigeria
Yoruba royalty
University of Ibadan alumni
Lagos State politicians
Nigerian Permanent Secretaries
20th-century Nigerian politicians
21st-century Nigerian politicians
Year of birth missing (living people)
People from Ikorodu
Citizens of Nigeria through descent